River Clydach may refer to the following rivers in Wales:

Lower Clydach River, Swansea Valley
Upper Clydach River, Swansea Valley
River Clydach, Monmouthshire, Monmouthshire
River Clydach (Neath)
Nant Clydach, Rhondda